Ingunn Hultgreen Weltzien (born 19 May 1986) is a Norwegian orienteering competitor and cross-country skier.

She received a bronze medal in the relay event at the 2007 World Orienteering Championships in Kyiv, together with Marianne Andersen and Anne Margrethe Hausken. She became Junior World Champion in sprint in Druskininkai in 2006.

She represents the club IL Tyrving. She has a silver medal in the 3000 metres steeplechase at the 2008 Norwegian Championships, with the time 10:24.69 minutes, a personal best.

Ingunn Hultgreen Welzien is daughter of orienteering world champion (in relay) and cross-country skier Eystein Weltzien, and her mother, Wenche, has also been on the national orienteering team. She is a younger sister of Audun Weltzien.

References

External links
 
 

1986 births
Living people
Sportspeople from Bærum
Norwegian orienteers
Female orienteers
Norwegian female cross-country skiers
Norwegian female long-distance runners
Norwegian female steeplechase runners
Foot orienteers
World Orienteering Championships medalists
21st-century Norwegian women
Junior World Orienteering Championships medalists